Emre Taner (born 1942, Lice Diyarbakır) is a Turkish civil servant who was until May 2010 the undersecretary (i.e. chief) of the governmental intelligence agency of Turkey, the National Intelligence Organization (MİT).

Career 
After graduating from the School of Political Science at Ankara University, he entered the intelligence agency in 1967 and served almost in all the sections of the organization. Between 1984 and 1986, Emre Taner was the chief of Istanbul region bureau. In 1987, he became the head of intelligence department, and was appointed Deputy Undersecretary of MİT in 1992. From 1994 on, Emre Taner served in foreign countries until his appointment to Deputy Undersecretary for Operations on April 7, 1999. Emre Taner succeeded Şenkal Atasagun, who retired on June 15, 2005 from his post before his term of office. Taner announced a restructuring of the MİT at the start of 2009. On May 26, 2010, Taner passed the post on to his successor Hakan Fidan.

Head of the National Intelligence Organization 
He is known for rejuvenating the organization, and encouraging the government to adopt a more active stance with regard to foreign policy. Besides he is credited with reducing the turf war between the MİT and the General Directorate of Security as well as infighting inside the MİT itself. Between 2008 and 2009 he was involved in the peace negotiations with members of the outlawed Kurdistan Workers' Party (PKK) which took place in Oslo, Norway and Kurdish leaders in Iraq. Due to this peace talks with the PKK he and his successor Fidan were summoned in testify by prosecutor Sadrettin Sarıkaya in early February 2012. Sarikaya was arrested the same month and the law concerning investigations on the MIT was changed in way that the prime ministers consent was mandatory. The warrant on him was removed on the 18 February 2012.

Personal life 
He was born 1942 in Diyarbakır. He is married.

References 

 

1942 births
Living people
People from Lice, Turkey
Ankara University Faculty of Political Sciences alumni
People of the National Intelligence Organization (Turkey)
Directors of intelligence agencies